This is a list of public holidays in Montenegro.

Official holidays 
All state and other holidays are non-working days. The religious holidays are non-working days for the specific religious communities.

Note: If the first day of State and Other holidays falls on Sunday, then the next two working days are non-working days. And, If the second day of State and Other holidays falls on Sunday, then the next working day is a non-working day.

Unofficial holidays 
In addition to the official state, other and religious holidays; many other religious, ethnic, and other traditional holidays populate the calendar. These are rarely observed by businesses as non-working days.

See also
 Public holidays in Yugoslavia

References 
 ZAKON O DRŽAVNIM I DRUGIM PRAZNICIMA (Law on State and Other Holidays) - Official Gazette of Montenegro Nr. 27/2007 (17.5.2007)
 ZAKON O SVETKOVANJU VJERSKIH PRAZNIKA (Law on Celebrating Religious Holidays) - Official Gazette of Montenegro Nr. 56/1993 (29.12.1993)

 
Montenegro
Events in Montenegro
Society of Montenegro